Jeremy Horton is a fictional character from the soap opera, Days of Our Lives. Jeremy Allen and Jeffrey Clark were both in the role for short periods during 1989. Trevor Donovan took on the part from June 1, 2007, to October 17, 2007.

Storylines
Jeremy returns to Salem on June 1, 2007, when Stephanie Johnson introduces him and his friend, Jett Carver, to her cousin, Chelsea Brady. Jeremy and Chelsea develop an immediate dislike for one another, whereas Jett develops an interest in her. Jeremy and Jett, both pilots, are planning to launch a private flight service, known as Touch the Sky Airlines, in which high rollers from Salem would be flown to Las Vegas once a week. Chelsea and Stephanie agree to become flight attendants and Max Brady joins as a financial backer. On July 17, 2007, Stephanie angers Jeremy and as a result he puts her head underwater in a hot tub, nearly drowning her, revealing his abusive side to Stephanie. However, he covered this up by declaring how much he loves to be with her. On July 31, 2007, it is revealed that Jeremy used to bein jail. The next episode, it is revealed that while he had stolen a car for a joyride and shoplifted when he was younger, he was also convicted of fraud because he set up a bogus charity for cancer-afflicted children and used the proceeds on a condominium and sports car. Jermey had briefly developed a friendship with Sami Brady (Alison Sweeney), the wife of his uncle Lucas Horton (Bryan Dattilo), during his short-term presence in Salem in 2007. On August 14, 2007, Jeremy tells Max the truth, and helps save his second cousin Nick Fallon and the two boys in Nick's care when they are attacked in their home. Hoping to set his life on the right track again, Jeremy leaves Salem in October 2007.

See also
Mike Horton

External links
Days of Our Lives Jeremy Horton Profile 
About DAYS: Who's Who in Salem | Jeremy Horton | Days of our Lives @ soapcentral.com
Jeremy Horton Played by Trevor Donovan on Days of Our Lives - Soaps.com

Days of Our Lives characters
Television characters introduced in 1989
Male characters in television
Horton family